Filyos Natural-gas Processing Plant is a plant under construction for natural-gas processing  located at the port of Filyos in Çaycuma district, Zonguldak Province, Turkey.

It is expected that the laying down of nearly -long pipeline undersea will start in June 2022. It is planned that the construction of the pipeline with pipes of  length each will last around five months. The plant will be connected to the national natural gas pipeline system in the first quarter of 2023,  and will eventually process 3.5 billion cubic metres a year. It is being constructed by TPAO, and will be run by BOTAŞ.

References

Proposed energy infrastructure in Turkey
Natural gas pipelines in Turkey
Black Sea energy
Buildings and structures in Zonguldak Province
Buildings and structures under construction in Turkey
Çaycuma
Natural gas in Turkey